Andrei Lupan (15 February 1912 – 24 August 1992) was a writer, politician, and chairman of Moldovan Writers' Union (1946–1955; 1958–1961).

Biography 

Studied in the agriculture school from Cucuruzeni, Viticulture School from Chişinău and Agriculture Institute from Chişinău. During student time participate to the communist movement in Bessarabia. Chairman of the Writers Union of Moldovan SSR (1946–1962), secretary in the Board of USSR Union of Writers (1954–1971).

The first appearance is the poem Biography in the journal "Adevărul Literar şi Artistic". Before the war has published only sometimes poetry and essays in revues or papers. The main themes of his poetry are the peasant destiny, the dignity and human honesty, the peaceful and honest work as symbol and purpose of the people. His poetry appear in following books: “Poetry” (1947), “Enter the ballad”(1954), “Master creator”(1958), “Brother of the land” (1959), “The welcome law” (1966), “Gromovnic” (1973), “Selected writings” (1973). A. Lupan writes also essays, articles, getting involved in a large range of events and analysis. He was also a statesman in many republican and USSR organizations.

Awards
A.Lupan got the Moldavian Soviet Socialist Republic State Prize in 1967 and the USSR State Prize in 1975 and many other awards.

External links 
 Andrei Lupan webpage

1912 births
1992 deaths
People from Șoldănești District
Moldovan writers
Moldovan male writers
Moldovan politicians
Moldovan poets
Male poets
Romanian communists
Recipients of the Order of Lenin
20th-century poets